Aavesha is a 1990 Indian Kannada-language action film written and directed by Perala. It was produced by Ravikrishna under the Ravikrishna films banner. Shankar Nag, Geetha, Devaraj and Bhavya star. This was the debut movie of Ramkumar and Shivaranjini.

Cast
Shankar Nag 
Devaraj
Bhavya
Geetha
Ramkumar
Doddanna
Ramesh Bhat
Shivaranjini

Soundtrack
All the songs are composed and scored by Hamsalekha.

References

1990 films
1990s Kannada-language films
Indian action films
Films scored by Hamsalekha
1990 action films